Chakwal railway station is located at Chakwal, Pakistan.

See also
 List of railway stations in Pakistan
 Pakistan Railways

References

Railway stations in Chakwal District
Railway stations on Mandra–Bhaun Railway Line